Martín Giménez is the name of two footballers:

 Martín Giménez (footballer, born 1988), currently playing for Club Atlético Fénix
 Martín Giménez (footballer, born 1991), currently playing for Club Sol de América